Perumbavoor G. Raveendranath is an Indian musician from Kerala. He is well known as a carnatic musician as well as a composer. He lives in Thiruvananthapuram now, though hails from Perumbavoor, Ernakulam. His works always have the deep-rooted carnatic touch in it.

Composer 

Raveendranath has rendered music to many films in Malayalam such as Innale, Sneham, and Thoovanathumbikal. He won the Kerala State Film Award for the best music director for the Padmarajan directed movie Innale. He teamed up with K. J. Yesudas for Tharangani studio to create some of the best devotional albums in Malayalam. His album Thrimadhuram is one such album.

Early life 
Perumbavoor G. Raveendranath was born to Adv. V. R. Gopalapillai and Bhargaviamma in the town of Perumbavoor in the present-day Ernakulam district on 5 January 1944, as their youngest son. He lost his father when he was one and a half years old. He has completed his Bachelors in Chemistry from Sree Sankara College Kalady. He is married to Shobha Menon and has got 2 children.

Filmography 
 Thoovanathumbikal     1987
Vadakagunda           1988
 Panchali		1989
 Innale		1990
 Bharathi Nagar May-9	1990
 Post Box No. 27	1991
 Vasudha		1992
 Ayalathe Adheham	1992
 Alanchery Thambrakkal	1995
 Aksharam		1995
 Chitrasalabham	1998
 Sneham		1998
Sayahnam		2000
 Thandavam		2002
Vasantha Malika	2003
 Vasanthathinte Kanal Vazhikalil 2014
Randam Yaamam		Uncategorized
 Poomaram 2018

Awards
1990 - Kerala State Film Award for Best Music Director - Innale
1994 - Kerala Sangeetha Nataka Akademi Award
2017 - Kerala Sangeetha Nataka Akademi Fellowship

References

External links 

 Perumbavoor G. Raveendranath at MSI

Malayalam film score composers
Musicians from Thiruvananthapuram
Kerala State Film Award winners
Living people
Film musicians from Kerala
20th-century Indian musicians
1944 births
Indian male film score composers
20th-century male musicians
Recipients of the Kerala Sangeetha Nataka Akademi Fellowship
Recipients of the Kerala Sangeetha Nataka Akademi Award